Steven James Dronsfield (born 1971), is a male former swimmer who competed for England.

Swimming career
Dronsfield represented England in the 100 metres butterfly and the 100 metres freestyle events and won a silver medal in the 4 x 100 metres freestyle relay, at the 1990 Commonwealth Games in Auckland, New Zealand.

References

1971 births
English male swimmers
Swimmers at the 1990 Commonwealth Games
Commonwealth Games medallists in swimming
Commonwealth Games silver medallists for England
Living people
Medallists at the 1990 Commonwealth Games